Delwin L. Jones (April 2, 1924 – July 25, 2018) was an American politician, who, prior to 2011, was the oldest member of the Texas House of Representatives.

In the Republican primary held on May 29, 2012, Jones, at the age of eighty-eight, failed in a bid to unseat Perry. Jones survived his illness.

In 2015, Jones received the George Mahon Award, named for former U.S. Representative George Mahon, from the Lubbock Professional Chapter of the Association for Women in Communications.

Death

Jones died at the age of 94. He was interred at the Texas State Cemetery in Austin. Former state Senator Robert Duncan described Jones as "always involved in different types of activities, as a volunteer at the Lions Club, and ... active in the Republican Party, helping the new candidates learn the ropes and understand how to get elected.”

References

1924 births
2018 deaths
Members of the Texas House of Representatives
People from Lubbock, Texas
Texas Tech University alumni
Businesspeople from Texas
Texas Democrats
Texas Republicans
United States Army Air Forces personnel of World War II
21st-century American politicians
Military personnel from Texas
20th-century American businesspeople